Samuel Mbappé Léppé (1936–1985) also known as Mbappé Moumi Samuel was a Cameroonian professional footballer who played as a midfielder. He comes from the Sawa community.

Biography

Childhood 
Samuel Mbappé Léppé was born on 28 February 1936 in Douala. He was the son of Moumè Mbappé and de Rose Ebelle.

Career 
He played for Oryx Douala in the 1950s and 1960s, winning five Cameroon championship titles (1961, 1963, 1964, 1965 and 1967), three times the Cameroon Cup (1963, 1968 and 1970) and he was the first captain to lift the African Cup of Champions Clubsin the 1964–65 season. Roger Milla describes him as being the greatest. Over the course of his career, he earned several transfer deals European clubs offered him a chance to play professional football in Europe but he refused to join them.

Nicknamed the "Marshal". he also served as the captain of the Cameroon football team at a point in his career.

He was part of the Cameroonian squad who were selected to play in the 1970 African Cup of Nations however Cameroon were unfortunately eliminated in the group stage. His brother Ebèllé Moumi Walter was also a footballer. The "Moumi" brothers both played careers with Oryx Douala and the Cameroon national team.

Legacy 

In 1982, the Cameroonian government issued a 125  F stamp bearing the image of Mbappé in honour of him. 

The Akwa Stadium was renamed after him as the Stade Mbappé Léppé. He was posthumously awarded the "African Legend" trophy by the Confederation of African Football in 2015 during the 2015 CAF Awards.

References

External links 

 
 

1936 births
Cameroon international footballers
Cameroonian footballers
Association football midfielders
Footballers from Douala
1970 African Cup of Nations players
1985 deaths